Alive 4-Ever RETURNS is a shooter game developed and published by Hong Kong studio Meridian Digital Entertainment for iOS in 2010. It is the sequel to the 2009 game Alive 4-Ever.

Reception

The game received "favorable" reviews according to the review aggregation website Metacritic.

References

External links
 

2010 video games
IOS games
IOS-only games
Multiplayer and single-player video games
Shooter video games
Video game sequels
Video games about zombies
Video games developed in Hong Kong
Meridian Digital Entertainment games